The Housing and Urban Development Act of 1965 is a major revision to federal housing policy in the United States which instituted several major expansions in federal housing programs. 

The United States Congress passed and President Lyndon B. Johnson signed the legislation on August 10, 1965. Johnson called it "the single most important breakthrough" in federal housing policy since the 1920s. The legislation greatly expanded funding for existing federal housing programs, and added new programs to provide rent subsidies for the elderly and disabled; housing rehabilitation grants to poor homeowners; provisions for veterans to make very low down-payments to obtain mortgages; new authority for families qualifying for public housing to be placed in empty private housing (along with subsidies to landlords); and matching grants to localities for the construction of water and sewer facilities, construction of community centers in low-income areas, and urban beautification. Four weeks later, on September 9, President Johnson signed legislation establishing the Department of Housing and Urban Development.

References

United States Department of Housing and Urban Development
United States federal housing legislation
1965 in law
89th United States Congress
Presidency of Lyndon B. Johnson
Aaron